PalaTorino (formally PalaStampa and Mazda Palace) was an indoor sports arena, located in Turin, Italy. The capacity of the arena was 10,000 people. It hosted concerts and indoor sporting events.

The arena was inaugurated as PalaStampa in 1994 with a concert by Italian singer Adriano Celentano.
Since the opening of the larger PalaOlimpico ifor the 2006 Winter Olympics, in December 2005, the PalaTorino has been rarely used, and the city of Turin decided to close this venue in 2011.

Notes

External links
Official Site

Defunct sports venues in Italy
Defunct indoor arenas